Giles Alington may refer to:

Giles Alington (MP) (1500–1586)
Giles Alington, 2nd Baron Alington (c. 1641–1659) 
Giles Alington, 4th Baron Alington (1680–1691), Irish peer
Giles Allington, the Ancient Planter
Giles Alington (academic) (1914–1956), Fellow of University College, Oxford

See also
Giles Green of Allington, Dorset, 17th Century MP